Alex Sinclair (born 2 December 1968) is a Mexican comic-book colorist known for his work with Jim Lee and Scott Williams.

Career
Sinclair is well known for his collaborations with Jim Lee and Scott Williams. He has previously worked on Astro City, Alan Moore's Top 10, Harley Quinn and with Lee & Williams on Batman: Hush, Superman, WildCATs, Gen¹³, Divine Right, All-Star Batman and Robin, Infinite Crisis and 52.

Bibliography

Comics work includes:
 Top 10

References

External links
 
 

Living people
American comics artists
1968 births
Comics colorists